Neil McCarthy (born 29 November 1974) is an English former Rugby union player.

McCarthy was born in Slough. He was in the  team for the 1999 Rugby World Cup in Wales and is one of only a handful of players to have an England cap at every representative level (U16; U18; U21; Saxons & Senior).

He played as a hooker but could also cover prop. He was involved with the England team from 1999 to 2000, including the Rugby World Cup 1999.

McCarthy started his early rugby career at Bath academy before moving to Gloucester and then to Bristol where his career was effectively ended in 2002 by a serious knee injury. McCarthy spent two years attempting to come back from the injury which included a final spell with Orrell Rugby, eventually retiring in 2004 after further complications from the original injury.

He was Leicester Tigers Academy director from 2007 to 2015 and produced current England players George Ford, Manu Tuilagi, Dan Cole, Tom Croft, Billy Twelvetrees and the Youngs Brothers Ben and Tom. On 11 March 2015, McCarthy returned to Gloucester Rugby to become their new Head of Academy. Having  restructured and established the Gloucester academy as a leading programme McCarthy moved into Olympic sport with British Skeleton based in Bath, UK.

References

1974 births
Living people
Alumni of the University of Bath
Bristol Bears players
England international rugby union players
English rugby union players
Gloucester Rugby players
Orrell R.U.F.C. players
Rugby union hookers
Rugby union players from Slough